Denise Beckwith (born 7 December 1977) is a Paralympic swimming competitor from Australia. She was born in Sydney, New South Wales.  She won a bronze medal at the 2000 Sydney Games in the Women's 4x50 m Freestyle 20 pts event.

References

Female Paralympic swimmers of Australia
Swimmers at the 2000 Summer Paralympics
Paralympic bronze medalists for Australia
Living people
1977 births
Medalists at the 2000 Summer Paralympics
Paralympic medalists in swimming
Australian female freestyle swimmers
S4-classified Paralympic swimmers